W17CT-D, virtual and UHF digital channel 17, is a Retro TV-affiliated low-powered television station licensed to Manteo, North Carolina, United States. The station is owned by Lawrence Loesch.

History
The station was granted its permit under the callsign W17CT on January 18, 2002. On July 24, 2012, it was assigned its current callsign of W17CT-D.

Digital channels
The station's digital signal is multiplexed:

References

External links
East Carolina Television Network

 

Low-power television stations in the United States
Retro TV affiliates
NewsNet affiliates
Television channels and stations established in 2002
17CT-D
Dare County, North Carolina